Kandy Wong Shan-yee (born 16 October 1987), also known as her stage name "Tong Mui", is the vocal of the Hong Kong-based band Sugar Club,  she is regarded as a lookalike for the Cantopop singer Priscilla Chan .

Biography
Kandy Wong was born in Hong Kong. Before rising to fame, she had uploaded a song on the internet with her original name Candy Wong (黃麗怡).

In 2007, Wong decided to form the band Sugar Club with Sebastian Poon, a guitarist and vocal of another band introduced by her friend. Later, Sugar Club gained the opportunity to perform at the Langham Place The Mall every week, until the end of 2010.

In 2008, their performance was admired by WOW Music and they were signed to the record label at the same year. On 30 December 2010, they released their debut album I Love Sugar Club Best.

In 2011, Wong was program host with Suki Chui and Janice Ting for the TVB food show My Sweets.

From 2012 til now, Wong has been a part of several television shows and dramas, the most notable one being the music show JSG in 2012 and the drama Season of Love in 2013.

In 2022, Wong’s contract with WOW ended.

Discography
Pink Girls（EP）（2011）

Filmography

Television dramas

Films

References

External links
 Kandy's Instagram
 

1987 births
Living people
Hong Kong television actresses
21st-century Hong Kong women singers
Cantopop singers
Cantonese-language singers